Nowhere Now may refer to:

Nowhere Now: The Ballad of Joshua Tree, directed Don DiNicola
"Nowhere Now", from The Devil You Know (Econoline Crush album)
"Nowhere Now", from To the Bone (Steven Wilson album)